The Breeders Crown 3YO Colt & Gelding Pace is a harness racing event for three-year-old Standardbred pacers. It is one part of the Breeders Crown annual series of twelve races for both Standardbred trotters and trotters. First run in 1985, it is contested over a distance of one mile. Race organizers have awarded the event to various racetracks across North America. The 2017 race will be held at Hoosier Park in Anderson, Indiana, United States.

Historical race events
In 2010, Pocono Downs became the first venue to host all 12 events on a single night.

North American Locations
Woodbine Racetrack (Wdb) Ontario (9)
Pompano Park (Ppk) Florida (4)
Meadowlands Racetrack (Mxx) New Jersey (4)
Mohawk Raceway (Moh) Ontario (4)
Pocono Downs (Pcd) Pennsylvania (2)
Colonial Downs (Cln) Virginia (1) 
Garden State Park (Gsp) New Jersey (3)
Yonkers Raceway (YR) New York (1)
Freehold Raceway (Fhl) New Jersey (1)
Northfield Park (Nfl) Ohio (1)
Northlands Park (NP) Alberta (1)

Records
 Most wins by a driver
 4 – Michel Lachance (1989, 1994, 1996, 1998)

 Most wins by a trainer
 4 – Brett Pelling (1996, 1999, 2004, 2005)

 Stakes record
 1:48 0/0 – Racing Hill (2016)

Winners of the Breeders Crown 3YO Colt & Gelding Pace

References

Recurring sporting events established in 1984
Harness racing in the United States
Harness racing in Canada
Breeders Crown
Racing series for horses
Horse races in Alberta
Horse races in Florida
Horse races in New Jersey
Horse races in New York (state)
Horse races in Ohio
Horse races in Ontario
Horse races in Pennsylvania
Horse races in Virginia